Andrew Joel King (born November 9, 1978) is a former American football offensive guard. He played for the St. Louis Rams in 2002-2003. He played college football at Illinois State.

References 

1978 births
Living people
American football offensive guards
Illinois State Redbirds football players
St. Louis Rams players
Amsterdam Admirals players